A desmoplastic trichoepithelioma is a cutaneous condition characterized by a solitary, firm skin lesion on the face.

Treatment 
Desmoplastic trichoepithelioma is a benign tumour and can be managed safely with surgical removal, electrodesiccation and curettage.

See also 
 Trichoepithelioma
 Skin lesion

References 

Epidermal nevi, neoplasms, and cysts